Hayward is an unincorporated community in Washington County, Oregon, United States.  It is located off U.S. 26 near Manning. It has a cemetery and once had a post office, and before 1891, the neighboring town of Greenville, Oregon had the only nearby post office.

References 

Unincorporated communities in Washington County, Oregon
Unincorporated communities in Oregon